Ingeborg Taschner (born 1930) is a former German film editor. She was married to fellow editor Herbert Taschner with whom she had an actor son Kai Taschner. She worked for many years for Bavaria Film in her native Munich.

Selected filmography
 The Green Devils of Monte Cassino (1958)
 The Scarlet Baroness (1959)
 Isola Bella (1961)
 I Must Go to the City (1962)
 The Sold Grandfather (1962)
 Venusberg (1963)
 Aunt Frieda (1965)
 The Blood of the Walsungs (1965)
 I Am Looking for a Man (1966)
 Once a Greek (1966)
 Love Nights in the Taiga (1967)
 All People Will Be Brothers (1973)
 Hubertus Castle (1973)
 Only the Wind Knows the Answer (1974)
 Three Men in the Snow (1974)
 Crime After School (1975)
 Silence in the Forest (1976)
 Waldrausch (1977)

References

Bibliography 
 Torsten Körner. Der kleine Mann als Star: Heinz Rühmann und seine Filme der 50er Jahre. Campus Verlag, 2001.

External links 
 

1930 births
Living people
Film people from Munich
German film editors
German women film editors